Big Eyes is a 2014 American biographical drama film directed by Tim Burton, written by Scott Alexander and Larry Karaszewski, and starring Amy Adams and Christoph Waltz. It is about the relationship between American artist Margaret Keane and her second husband, Walter Keane, who, in the 1950s and 1960s, took credit for Margaret's phenomenally popular paintings of people with big eyes.

The film had its world premiere in New York City on December 15, 2014, and was released in the U.S. by The Weinstein Company on December 25, 2014. It was met with generally favorable reviews, with particular praise given to the performances of Adams and Waltz and performed moderately well at the box office, grossing $29 million worldwide against the budget of $10 million. Adams won the Golden Globe Award for Best Actress – Motion Picture Comedy or Musical and received a nomination for the BAFTA for Best Actress in a Leading Role. Waltz was also nominated for a Golden Globe for his performance, and Lana Del Rey received a Golden Globe nomination for the film's title song, "Big Eyes".

Plot
In the 1950s, Margaret Ulbrich leaves her then-husband and takes her young daughter Jane to North Beach, San Francisco, where she gets a job painting illustrations at a furniture factory. While doing portraits at an outdoor art show, she meets Walter Keane, who sells paintings of Parisian street scenes but makes his money in real estate. They soon become close friends. Margaret is distraught when her husband asks for custody of Jane as part of the divorce settlement. Walter proposes, and they marry and honeymoon in Hawaii. She retains custody of Jane.

Unable to get his or Margaret's paintings into a fine art gallery, Walter convinces Enrico Banducci, the owner of a popular jazz club, to rent him some wall space to exhibit their work. He is frustrated when the designated space is in the back by the bathrooms. He fights with Banducci and puts the man's head through one of Margaret's canvases. This becomes a front-page story in a local newspaper, which packs the club with people curious to see the art that made grown men fight. Dick Nolan, a celebrity gossip columnist, wants to know more about the artwork, but proceeds to ask about Margaret's paintings of young girls with big eyes. Walter goes along with the misunderstanding, failing to clarify that they are Margaret's creation. Afterward, he shows Margaret how much money he made selling her work and suggests they team up, with her staying at home painting and him taking credit and handling publicity and sales.

Walter opens his own gallery selling Margaret's art, and eventually hits on the idea of making cheap reproductions of Margaret's works, which sell in huge numbers. The family moves into a mansion. Walter spends his time hobnobbing with celebrities while Margaret is stuck at home, feeling increasingly isolated. He even makes Margaret lie to Jane about who is doing the paintings.

One day, she finds a crate full of paintings of Parisian street scenes, all signed "S. CENIC". She realizes that she has never actually seen Walter paint, and discovers that he has been painting over the name of the original artist and claiming these paintings as his own. When confronted, he says he always wanted to be an artist but never had the talent.

Disillusioned, Margaret indicates that she is losing her interest in continuing the ruse, so Walter threatens to have her killed. Later, he tells her of his plan to get a painting displayed at the upcoming New York World's Fair and demands Margaret paint her "masterpiece". Jane sneaks into the studio when Margaret is working on the huge painting, Tomorrow Forever, and says she already knew Margaret was really the artist.

At a party, Walter becomes angry after reading John Canaday's scathing review of Tomorrow Forever, which leads the Fair not to exhibit the painting, and confronts the critic. At home, he drunkenly blames Margaret for the failure. He throws lit matches at her and Jane, who escape and lock themselves in the studio.  As he continues to throw lit matches and nearly sets the house on fire, they run away from home.

One year later, Margaret and Jane have settled in Honolulu, Hawaii. Walter says he will only grant Margaret a divorce if she signs over the rights to every painting and produces 100 more. Initially,  Margaret agrees, but her growing interest in the Jehovah's Witnesses convinces her of the importance of honesty. She finally signs a batch of paintings with her own name. Later, on a Hawaiian radio show, she reveals that she is the real artist behind the "big eyes" paintings, which makes national news. Nolan publishes Walter's claims that Margaret is delusional. On Jane's suggestion,  Margaret sues both Walter and Nolan's newspaper for slander and libel.

At the trial, the judge immediately dismisses the libel suit against the newspaper, and Walter is left to defend himself against slander. He botches his defence, even mimicking in court what he has gathered from watching Perry Mason episodes on TV.  When he proceeds to cross-examine himself as a witness, the judge becomes fed up and directs both Margaret and Walter to create a painting in court to prove who the real artist is. Whereas Margaret paints steadily, Walter stalls before claiming his arm hurts too much to hold a paintbrush. Margaret wins the lawsuit and a fan asks her to sign a copy of Walter's coffee table book.

The film ends with text stating that Walter continued to insist he was the true artist until his death, though he never painted again, and that he died in poverty. Margaret eventually moved back to San Francisco, where she opened a new gallery, and still paints every day.

Cast 

 Amy Adams as Margaret Keane
 Christoph Waltz as Walter Keane
 Danny Huston as Dick Nolan
 Krysten Ritter as Dee-Ann
 Jason Schwartzman as Ruben
 Terence Stamp as John Canaday
 Jon Polito as Enrico Banducci
 Delaney Raye as a Young Jane
 Madeleine Arthur as Older Jane
 James Saito as Judge
 Dylan Kingwell as Boy at Art Show (in the park)

Production
Writers Scott Alexander and Larry Karaszewski negotiated with Margaret Keane over her life rights and wrote Big Eyes as a spec script. In October 2007, it was announced that development was moving forward with Alexander and Karaszewski directing their script, and nightclub operator Andrew Meieran fully financing, through his Bureau of Moving Pictures banner, the under-$20 million budget. Kate Hudson and Thomas Haden Church were set to star, and filming was to begin in June 2008, before being pushed back for reasons related to a new Screen Actors Guild contract.

In September 2010, it was announced that Tim Burton had become involved with the film as a producer. Principal photography was scheduled to start in April 2012, with Reese Witherspoon and Ryan Reynolds attached to star. By 2013, Burton had taken over directing and Big Eyes was set up at The Weinstein Company, with Amy Adams and Christoph Waltz starring. Filming began in July 2013.

Big Eyes is Burton's first film since Edward Scissorhands (1990) to be edited by someone other than Chris Lebenzon, who was busy with Maleficent the same year.

Soundtrack

It was reported in November 2014 that singer Lana Del Rey would contribute with two original songs to the soundtrack, and the songs "Big Eyes" and "I Can Fly", which Lana Del Rey wrote and performed, were leaked in December 2014. The soundtrack album and both songs were officially released on December 23, 2014.

Reception

Box office
The film earned $3 million during its opening weekend and grossed $14.5 million in North America, and $14.8 million internationally, for a worldwide total gross of $29.3 million.

Critical reception
On Rotten Tomatoes, Big Eyes holds an approval rating of 72%, based on 190 reviews, with an average rating of 6.7/10; the site's consensus reads: "Well-acted, thought-provoking, and a refreshing change of pace for Tim Burton, Big Eyes works both as a biopic and as a timelessly relevant piece of social commentary". On Metacritic, the film has a score of 62 out of 100, based on 40 critics, indicating "generally favorable reviews".

The Philadelphia Inquirers Steven Rea awarded the film three-and-a-half stars out of four, praising Adams' and Waltz's performances and the film's themes. Peter Travers of Rolling Stone criticized the film's uneven tone and pacing, but admitted it was a "heartfelt tribute to the yearning that drives even the most marginalized artist to self expression no matter what the hell anyone thinks."

Awards and nominations

See also
 "Big Eyes" (song)

References

External links
 
 
 
 

2014 films
2010s biographical films
American biographical films
Biographical films about painters
American courtroom films
2010s feminist films
Films featuring a Best Musical or Comedy Actress Golden Globe winning performance
Films scored by Danny Elfman
Films directed by Tim Burton
Films set in 1958
Films set in 1963
Films set in 1964
Films set in 1965
Films set in Honolulu
Films set in San Francisco
Films shot in San Francisco
Films shot in Vancouver
North Beach, San Francisco
Films with screenplays by Scott Alexander and Larry Karaszewski
Cultural depictions of American women
Cultural depictions of 20th-century painters
Ophthalmic conditions emphasizing symbolism
American feminist films
The Weinstein Company films
2010s English-language films
2010s American films
Films about artists